The 2018–2019 Jordanian Pro League (known as the Al-Manaseer Jordanian Pro League, named after Ziad AL-Manaseer Companies Group for sponsorship reasons) was the 67th season of Jordanian Pro League since its inception in 1944. The season started on 15 August 2018 and finished in May 2019.

Al-Wehdat are the defending champions of the 2017–18 season. Al-Salt and Al-Sareeh joined as the promoted clubs from the 2017–18 League Division 1. They replaced Mansheyat Bani Hasan and Al-Yarmouk who were relegated to the 2018–19 League Division 1.

Teams
Twelve teams will compete in the league – the top ten teams from the 2017–18 season and the two teams promoted from the 2017–18 Division 1.

Teams promoted to the 2018–2019 Premier League

The first team to be promoted was Al-Salt, following their 0–1 defeat against Al-Sareeh on 8 May 2018. Al-Salt are playing in the Premier League for the first time in their history. They were also promoted as the 2017–18 League Division 1 winners on 15 May 2018, following their 2–0 victory against Al-Arabi.

The second team to be promoted was Al-Sareeh, following their 2–0 victory against Sahab on 15 May 2018, the last day of the regular season. Al-Sareeh returned to the Premier League for the first time since the 2016–17 season.

Teams relegated to the 2018–19 Division 1

The first team to be relegated was Mansheyat Bani Hasan, following their 2–4 defeat against Shabab Al-Ordon on 26 April 2018, ending their 2-year stay in the top flight.

The second team to be relegated was Al-Yarmouk, ending their 1-year stay in the top flight.

Stadiums and locations
Note: Table lists in alphabetical order.

Personnel and kits

Managerial changes

Foreign players
The number of foreign players is limited to 3 per team, and should not be a goalkeeper.

League table

Results

Season progress

Statistics

Scoring
First goal of the season:   Bilal Danguir for Al-Baqa'a against Al-Hussein (24 August 2018)
Last goal of the season:   Ibrahim Al-Jawabreh for Al-Ahli against Al-Baqa'a (9 May 2019)

Top scorers

Hat-tricks

Number of teams by governorates

References

Jordanian Pro League seasons
2018–19 in Jordanian football
Jordan Premier League